Papagou ( or Παπάγος Papagos) is a suburb and municipal unit in the eastern part of the Athens agglomeration, Greece. The town is named after Marshal Alexandros Papagos, a general who led the Greek Army in the Second World War and the Greek Civil War, before becoming Prime Minister of Greece.  The Greek Ministry of National Defense is located in town.

Papagou was part of the municipality of Cholargos until 1965, when it became a separate community. It became a municipality in 1982. Since the 2011 local government reform it is part of the municipality Papagou-Cholargos, of which it is a municipal unit according to the Kallikratis Plan.

Geography
Papagou is situated west of the Hymettus mountains, 6 km east of Athens city centre. The municipal unit has an area of 3.375 km2. The eastern beltway Motorway 64 passes southeast of the town. Adjacent suburbs are Cholargos to the northeast and Zografou to the southwest.

Sports
Papagou B.C. is the professional basketball team of Papagou.

Historical population

Gallery

See also
List of municipalities of Attica

References

External links
 Official website 

Populated places in North Athens (regional unit)